¡Viva la Cobra! is the second studio album by Cobra Starship. The album was released on October 23, 2007. It was produced by Fall Out Boy's Patrick Stump, whose vocals also feature throughout the album. The album peaked at No. 80 on Billboard 200. It has sold more than 40,000 copies to date.

Background
Cobra Starship was formed in 2005 after Midtown bassist Gabe Saporta took a trip to the deserts of Arizona. During this time, Saporta went on a "vision quest", spending time with Native American tribes and smoking peyote. He began to create his vision for a new band, a melodic style of music heavily influenced by synthpop and hip-hop. Upon returning home, Saporta rented a house in the Catskill Mountains and began writing what would become the band's debut album, While the City Sleeps, We Rule the Streets. He posted a parody response to Gwen Stefani's "Hollaback Girl" titled "Hollaback Boy" on Myspace. The song gained Saporta notoriety on the internet and he eventually signed to Fall Out Boy bassist Pete Wentz's label, Decaydance Records.

Midtown's management company soon set Saporta up with an opportunity to record a song for the soundtrack to the 2006 Snakes on a Plane. Along with members of The Academy Is..., Gym Class Heroes, and The Sounds, Saporta recorded "Snakes on a Plane (Bring It)", which became a minor hit. During the recording of While the City Sleeps, We Rule the Streets, Saporta began recruiting new members to complete the group's lineup. He first enlisted drummer Nate Navarro, whom he met on tour while Navarro sold merchandise for fellow touring act Hidden In Plain View. After seeing Saporta in Entertainment Weekly, guitarist Ryland Blackinton and bassist Alex Suarez, who lived in the same apartment building as Midtown drummer Rob Hitt, emailed Saporta asking to join the group. The lineup was completed by keytarist Elisa Schwartz, who was later replaced by Victoria Asher in December 2006.

Recording and production
While on the 2007 Honda Civic Tour, the group began writing music together. The members recorded their individual parts on their laptops in the band's bus. By the time Cobra Starship entered the studio to work on a new album, much of the material was already written. The album was recorded in twenty days at Mission Sound Studios in Brooklyn, New York.

Composition

Music
The album has been described as "11 tracks of unabashed party jams, full of big hooky electropop, super-produced guitar crunch and the occasional T-Pain-style vocoder thrown in for good measure." "Smile for the Paparazzi" contains Latin influences, and "introduces a touch of Spanish heat to a thoroughly Americanized album".

Philadelphia-based gay hip-hop trio V.I.P appears on "Damn You Look Good and I'm Drunk (Scandalous)". Blackinton commented on the collaboration, stating, "V.I.P. are the best. Seriously. They're these dudes from Philly...and they write hard-core gay rap songs. And we had 'Scandalous,' and we thought it would be a good idea to have them come in and just offer their vocal talents. It was probably the most awesome thing we've ever done."

Lyrics
The majority of the lyrics on ¡Viva la Cobra! are inspired by Cobra Starship's rise to fame. Saporta explained "All of us played in punk-rock bands growing up, and we could never have dreamed of having this level of celebrity...On one hand, it's awesome because you're hanging out with all your friends, you're getting the VIP treatment. But then you also see how it's just like this big [flattery] convention. And the record is sort of about that contradiction, where on one hand you wanna have fun and party, but at the same time, it's a critique of that whole lifestyle." "Damn You Look Good and I'm Drunk (Scandalous)", which was originally titled "Fake Boobs and Rollerblades", discusses trashy women who the band often met at parties.

Title
Through the Fueled by Ramen street team, the band allowed members of the street team to choose between two possible song titles for five different songs on the record. The album was originally going to be called If the World Is Ending, We're Throwing the Party; however, singer Gabe Saporta stated that:

Critical reception

Critical response to ¡Viva la Cobra! was generally mixed to positive. Luke O'Neil of Alternative Press enjoyed the disc's "party-at-the-end-of-the-world" style, and stated that "Contemporary emo-pop sensibilities meet ’80s party abandon on this record, and neither have sounded so enjoyable in years." Mikael Wood of Entertainment Weekly gave the album a "B" grade, and concluded that the album improved upon its predecessor with "catchier hooks and harder-rocking beats". Jon Young of Spin praised Viva la Cobra's catchy nature, but felt that the album suffered from over-production, explaining "Sadly, the glitzy overkill production by Fall Out Boy's Patrick Stump nearly obliterates any potential dance-rock charm. Despite killer hooks, 'Guilty Pleasure' and 'The City Is at War' leave an artificial aftertaste." Andrew Leahey of Allmusic opined that the album was overly repetitive, commenting "There's enough melody here to satisfy most lingering fans...But even Stump can't give the band another sure-fire hit, as all the dance-pop numbers end up repeating the same steps in an attempt to perfect the one routine Cobra Starship knows how to do."

Track listing

Chart positions

Singles
"Kiss My Sass" (featuring Travie McCoy)
"The City Is at War"
"Guilty Pleasure" (with an appearance by Patrick Stump)

References

2007 albums
Cobra Starship albums
Fueled by Ramen albums
Decaydance Records albums
Albums produced by Patrick Stump